Focus is an album by the American jazz saxophonist Chico Freeman, featuring Arthur Blythe, recorded in 1994 and released on the Contemporary label.

Reception
The AllMusic review by Alex Henderson stated: "Focus didn't go down in history as one of Freeman's essential works, but it's a generally decent and occasionally excellent CD that he can be proud of".

Track listing
All compositions by Chico Freeman except as indicated
 "Bemsha Swing" (Denzil Best, Thelonious Monk) - 7:47  
 "Blackfoot" (George Cables) - 6:55  
 "Ah, George, We Hardly Knew Ya" (Don Pullen) - 9:57  
 "To Hear a Tear, Drop in the Rain" - 9:05  
 "Playpen" (Freeman, Ed Maguire) - 8:25  
 "Peacemaker" (Cecil McBee) - 11:41  
 "Rhythm-a-Ning" (Monk) - 8:11

Personnel
Chico Freeman - tenor saxophone
Arthur Blythe - alto saxophone
George Cables - piano
Santi Debriano - bass
Yoron Israel - drums

References 

Contemporary Records albums
Chico Freeman albums
1995 albums